This is a list of municipalities that have the Quebec municipal type township municipality, an administrative division defined by the Ministry of Municipal Affairs, Regions and Land Occupancy.

Township municipalities
(area is in km², population as of 2006)

There were several more township municipalities prior to the 2000–2006 municipal reorganization in Quebec:
Eaton; now in the City of Cookshire-Eaton
Grenville; now in the Municipality of Grenville-sur-la-Rouge
Lytton; now in the City of Montcerf-Lytton
Magog Township; now in the City of Magog
Masson-Angers; now in the City of Gatineau
Newport; merged into City of Cookshire-Eaton and then demerged; now the City of Newport
Sutton Township; now in the City of Sutton
Thetford-Partie-Sud; now in the City of Thetford Mines
Tremblay; now split between the City of Saguenay and the Municipality of Saint-Honoré
Wright; now in the City of Gracefield

Some other township municipalities have simply changed their status to ordinary municipality without undergoing any mergers.

See also
 List of united township municipalities in Quebec
 Eastern Townships

External links 
 MAMROT Répertoire des municipalités

References 

Township

Township
Quebec